The Commandant General Royal Marines is the professional head of the Royal Marines. The title has existed since 1943. The role is held by a General who is assisted by a Deputy Commandant General, with the rank of brigadier. This position is not to be confused with Captain General Royal Marines, the ceremonial head. The Commandant General Royal Marines is the counterpart to the Commandant of the United States Marine Corps.

History
In 1760 three naval captains were appointed colonels of marines. However, these were naval officers and it meant that the furthest a marine officer could advance was to lieutenant colonel. It was not until 1771 that commandants of the three divisions (Portsmouth, Plymouth and Chatham) were appointed. The first single professional head of the Royal Marine Forces was the Deputy Adjutant-General, a post which existed from 1825 until 1914 when the post was re-designated the Adjutant-General: the post holder usually held the rank of full general. Since 1943 the professional head of the Royal Marines has been the Commandant-General who held the rank of full general until 1977, the rank of lieutenant general until 1996 and the rank of major general until April 2021. On 30 April 2021 the Royal Marines announced for the first time since 1996, that a lieutenant general would be taking over the role, that person being Lieutenant General Robert Magowan. Magowan was also the first person to assume the role twice.

From 1825 until 1964 his headquarters office which changed location several times was known as the Royal Marine Office.

Role
The appointment had been held concurrently with that of Commander United Kingdom Amphibious Forces (COMUKAMPHIBFOR) since the creation of the Fleet Battle Staff in 2001. COMUKAMPHIBFOR was one of two deployable two-star maritime operational commanders (the other being Commander UK Maritime Forces (COMUKMARFOR), now Commander United Kingdom Strike Force, with particular responsibility for amphibious and littoral warfare. Unlike COMUKMARFOR, COMUKAMPHIBFOR is primarily configured to command as a combined joint task force and designed to support a single two star commander. In April 2018, it was announced that the two separate deployable two-star maritime operational commanders (COMUKMARFOR and COMUKAMPHIBFOR) would be merged into a single, larger, maritime battle staff.

In April 2021, the role passed to a more senior officer in a dual-hatted capacity, and the commandant general's role, as well as being the professional head of the Royal Marines, was identified as championing emerging concepts in amphibious warfare and maintaining critical ties with the US Marine Corps.

General Officers Commanding
General Officers Commanding have included:

Deputy Adjutant General Royal Marines
Major-General Sir James Campbell 1825–1831
Major-General Sir John Savage 1831–1836
Lieutenant-General Sir John Owen 1836–1854
Lieutenant-General Sir Robert Wesley 1854–1862
General Sir George Langley 1862–1867
General Samuel Lowder 1867–1872
General Sir George Schomberg 1872–1875
Lieutenant General George Rodney 1875–1878
Major-General Sir Charles Adair 1878–1883
General Sir John Williams 1883–1888
General Sir Howard Jones 1888–1893
General Sir Henry Tuson 1893–1900
Lieutenant-General John Morris 1900–1902
Lieutenant-General Sir William Wright 1902–1907
General Sir William Adair 1907–1911
General Sir William Nicholls 1911–1914

Adjutant General Royal Marines
General Sir William Nicholls 1914–1916
Major-General Sir David Mercer 1916–1920
Major-General Gunning Campbell July 1920–November 1920
General Sir Herbert Blumberg 1920–1924
General Sir Alexander Hutchison 1924–1927
General Sir Lewis Halliday 1927–1930
General Sir Richard Ford 1930–1933
General Sir Richard Foster 1933–1936 
General Sir William Godfrey 1936–1939
General Sir Alan Bourne 1939-1943

Commandant General Royal Marines

List of Deputy Commandants General

The following have served as Deputy Commandant General:

 –2013: Brigadier Bill Dunham
 2014–2017: Brigadier Richard Spencer
 2017–2020: Brigadier Haydn White
 2020–present: Brigadier Anthony R. Turner

References

Royal Marines
Military appointments of the Royal Marines